Cross Generating Station is a 2,390 MW, four unit coal-fired power station located in Pineville, South Carolina. It is owned by Santee Cooper, formally known as the South Carolina Public Service Authority. The nameplate capacity of each unit is 590.9 MW, 556.2 MW, 591 MW, and 652 MW respectively. In 2016, Cross switched from using higher quality bituminous coal, to refined coal, which is a lower quality coal that is refined to release less toxins and is backed by the US government. The future of the plant has become more uncertain due to downward trends in use, talks of shuttering the station, and converting it to natural gas. However, no official statements have been made on the future of the plant.

Environmental impact 
In 2018, Cross Generating Station released 8,969,208 tons of CO2, 3,230 tons of SO2, and 3,233 tons of NOX. Cross has a pond and a landfill that store coal ash from the site. An additional pond and landfill was closed down in 2017.

See also 

List of coal-fired power stations in the United States
List of power stations in South Carolina
Coal power in the United States
List of Power stations in the United States
List of largest power stations in the United States
Energy in the United States
Coal mining in the United States
Electricity sector of the United States
Coal-fired power plant
List of natural gas-fired power stations in the United States

References

External links 
 https://www.santeecooper.com/ (owner)
 https://www.carbonbrief.org/mapped-worlds-coal-power-plants
 https://www.eia.gov/state/?sid=SC

Power stations in the United States
Buildings and structures in Berkeley County, South Carolina